is a Japanese football player who plays for Tokyo Verdy.

Playing career
Tomisawa was born in Tokyo on July 8, 1982. He joined J1 League club Tokyo Verdy (formerly Verdy Kawasaki) from youth team in 2001. Although he debuted in 2001 and played as center back until 2004, he could not play many matches.

In 2005, Tomisawa moved to J2 League club Vegalta Sendai on loan. He became a regular player from April. However he could not play at all in the match for injury from July.

In 2006, Tomisawa returned to Verdy which was relegated to J2 from 2006. From July, he played many matches as center back and Verdy was promoted to J1 end of 2007 season. In 2008 season, he played many matches as defensive midfielder and side back. However Verdy was relegated to J2 in a year. Although he played as regular player until 2010, his opportunity to play decreased in 2011.

In 2012, Tomisawa moved to J1 club Yokohama F. Marinos. He became a regular player as defensive midfielder and Marinos won the 2nd place in 2013 J1 League and the champions in 2013 Emperor's Cup.

In July 2015, Tomisawa moved to J2 club JEF United Chiba. He played many matches as center back in 2015 and defensive midfielder in 2016.

In 2017, Tomisawa moved to J1 club Albirex Niigata. Although he played many matches, Albirex was relegated to J2 end of 2017 season.

In 2019, Tomisawa moved to J3 League club SC Sagamihara.

Club statistics
.

Honours
Yokohama F. Marinos
Emperor's Cup: 2013

References

External links

Profile at JEF United Chiba

1982 births
Living people
Association football people from Tokyo
Japanese footballers
J1 League players
J2 League players
J3 League players
Tokyo Verdy players
Vegalta Sendai players
Yokohama F. Marinos players
JEF United Chiba players
Albirex Niigata players
SC Sagamihara players
Association football defenders